The men's large hill individual ski jumping competition for the 1964 Winter Olympics was held in Bergiselschanze. It occurred on 9 February.

Results
Each competitor took three jumps, with the best two counting.

References

Ski jumping at the 1964 Winter Olympics